A gas giant is a giant planet composed mainly of hydrogen and helium. Gas giants are also called failed stars because they contain the same basic elements as a star. Jupiter and Saturn are the gas giants of the Solar System. The term "gas giant" was originally synonymous with "giant planet". However, in the 1990s, it became known that Uranus and Neptune are really a distinct class of giant planets, being composed mainly of heavier volatile substances (which are referred to as "ices"). For this reason, Uranus and Neptune are now often classified in the separate category of ice giants.

Jupiter and Saturn consist mostly of hydrogen and helium, with heavier elements making up between 3 and 13 percent of their mass. They are thought to consist of an outer layer of compressed molecular hydrogen surrounding a layer of liquid metallic hydrogen, with probably a molten rocky core inside. The outermost portion of their hydrogen atmosphere contains many layers of visible clouds that are mostly composed of water (despite earlier certainty that there was no water anywhere else in the Solar System) and ammonia. The layer of metallic hydrogen located in the mid-interior makes up the bulk of every gas giant and is referred to as "metallic" because the very large atmospheric pressure turns hydrogen into an electrical conductor. The gas giants' cores are thought to consist of heavier elements at such high temperatures and pressures that their properties are not yet completely understood.

The defining differences between a very low-mass brown dwarf (which can have a mass as low as roughly 13 times that of Jupiter) and a gas giant are debated. One school of thought is based on formation; the other, on the physics of the interior. Part of the debate concerns whether brown dwarfs must, by definition, have experienced nuclear fusion at some point in their history.

Terminology 
The term gas giant was coined in 1952 by the science fiction writer James Blish and was originally used to refer to all giant planets. It is, arguably, something of a misnomer because throughout most of the volume of all giant planets, the pressure is so high that matter is not in gaseous form. Other than solids in the core and the upper layers of the atmosphere, all matter is above the critical point, where there is no distinction between liquids and gases.  The term has nevertheless caught on, because planetary scientists typically use "rock", "gas", and "ice" as shorthands for classes of elements and compounds commonly found as planetary constituents, irrespective of what phase the matter may appear in. In the outer Solar System, hydrogen and helium are referred to as "gases"; water, methane, and ammonia as "ices"; and silicates and metals as "rocks". In this terminology, since Uranus and Neptune are primarily composed of ices, not gas, they are more commonly called ice giants and distinct from the gas giants.

Classification 

Theoretically, gas giants can be divided into five distinct classes according to their modeled physical atmospheric properties, and hence their appearance: ammonia clouds (I), water clouds (II), cloudless (III), alkali-metal clouds (IV), and silicate clouds (V). Jupiter and Saturn are both class I. Hot Jupiters are class IV or V.

Extrasolar

Cold gas giants 
A cold hydrogen-rich gas giant more massive than Jupiter but less than about  will only be slightly larger in volume than Jupiter. For masses above , gravity will cause the planet to shrink (see degenerate matter).

Kelvin–Helmholtz heating can cause a gas giant to radiate more energy than it receives from its host star.

Gas dwarfs 

Although the words "gas" and "giant" are often combined, hydrogen planets need not be as large as the familiar gas giants from the Solar System. However, smaller gas planets and planets closer to their star will lose atmospheric mass more quickly via hydrodynamic escape than larger planets and planets farther out.

A gas dwarf could be defined as a planet with a rocky core that has accumulated a thick envelope of hydrogen, helium and other volatiles, having as result a total radius between 1.7 and 3.9 Earth-radii.

The smallest known extrasolar planet that is likely a "gas planet" is Kepler-138d, which has the same mass as Earth but is 60% larger and therefore has a density that indicates a thick gas envelope.

A low-mass gas planet can still have a radius resembling that of a gas giant if it has the right temperature.

Precipitation and meteorological phenomena

Jovian weather 
Heat that is funneled upward by local storms is a major driver of the weather on gas giants. Much, if not all, of the deep heat escaping the interior flows up through towering thunderstorms. These disturbances develop into small eddies that eventually form storms such as the Great Red Spot on Jupiter. On Earth and Jupiter, lightning and the hydrologic cycle are intimately linked together to create intense thunderstorms. During a terrestrial thunderstorm, condensation releases heat that pushes rising air upward. This "moist convection" engine can segregate electrical charges into different parts of a cloud; the reuniting of those charges is lightning. Therefore, we can use lightning to signal to us where convection is happening. Although Jupiter has no ocean or wet ground, moist convection seems to function similarly compared to Earth.

Jupiter's Red Spot 
The Great Red Spot (GRS) is a high-pressure system located in Jupiter's southern hemisphere. The GRS is a powerful anticyclone, swirling at about 430 to 680 kilometers per hour counterclockwise around the center. The Spot has since become known for its ferocity, even feeding on smaller Jovian storms. Tholins are brown organic compounds found within the surface of various planets that are formed by exposure to UV irradiation. The tholins that exist on Jupiter's surface get sucked up into the atmosphere by storms and circulation; it is hypothesized that those tholins that become ejected from the regolith get stuck in Jupiter's GRS, causing it to be red.

Helium rain on Saturn and Jupiter 
Condensation of helium creates liquid helium rain on gas giants. On Saturn, this helium condensation occurs at certain pressures and temperatures when helium does not mix in with the liquid metallic hydrogen present on the planet. Regions on Saturn where helium is insoluble allow the denser helium to form droplets and act as a source of energy, both through the release of latent heat and by descending deeper into the center of the planet. This phase separation leads to helium droplets that fall as rain through the liquid metallic hydrogen until they reach a warmer region where they dissolve in the hydrogen. Since Jupiter and Saturn have different total masses, the thermodynamic conditions in the planetary interior could be such that this condensation process is more prevalent in Saturn than in Jupiter. Helium condensation could be responsible for Saturn's excess luminosity as well as the helium depletion in both Jupiter and Saturn's atmosphere of both.

Diamond rain on Uranus 
The internal heat of Uranus is very low. Uranus is the coldest planet in the Solar System with an upper atmospheric temperature of –224 °C. The deepest sections of the mantle are so hot and under such pressure that methane is decomposed to elemental carbon. Diamond rain is the potential result of this phenomenon. Higher up in the atmosphere where conditions are milder, products from the photolysis of methane (such as acetylene and diacetylene) have been detected; there is likely to be a lot of interesting organic chemistry (potentially life-enabling processes) happening in the regions between the diamond nucleation zone and the upper atmosphere.

See also 
 List of gravitationally rounded objects of the Solar System
 List of planet types
 Hot Jupiter
 Ice giant
 Kepler-1704b

References 

 
Types of planet